The Cork–Clare rivalry is a hurling rivalry between Irish county teams Cork and Clare.

While both teams play provincial hurling in the Munster Senior Hurling Championship, they have also enjoyed success in the All-Ireland Senior Hurling Championship, having won 34 championship titles between them to date. They played each other in the 2013 All-Ireland Senior Hurling Championship Final on 8 September, the first time that they had met in the final.

Roots

History

While Cork are regarded as one of the "big three" of hurling, with Kilkenny and Tipperary completing the trio, Clare have generally been regarded as one of the minnows of hurling for much of their championship lives. Due to both teams playing in the Munster series, meetings between Cork and Clare have been regular since the beginning of the provincial championship in 1888. 

The first great era of the rivalry came between 1927 and 1932, when Cork and Clare played each other on six occasions. While Cork had the bragging rights from the first three games, Clare defeated Cork, who were the reigning All-Ireland champions, in 1930. It was only their third ever defeat of Cork and a first in sixteen years. Cork reasserted their supremacy the following year by defeating Clare and claiming the subsequent All-Ireland crown, however, Clare dumped a depleted Cork team out of the championship in 1932.

The rivalry reached new heights in 1977 and 1978, when the Munster decider on both occasions was contested by Cork and Clare. Clare won the National Hurling League in both 1977 and 1978 and had high hopes of claiming championship honours. The era belonged to Cork, however, as their triumph in both provincial deciders led to the team securing a hat-trick of All-Ireland crowns.

One of the most intense periods in the rivalry occurred between 1993 and 1999. For the first time ever, Clare secured four successive championship victories over Cork (1993, 1995, 1997 and 1998). In 1999 Clare, as Munster champions, faced Cork in one of the defining games of the year. In a changing of the guard, a young Cork team triumphed over a Clare team who had won two All-Ireland titles and three Munster titles in the previous three years.

Statistics

All time results

External links
 Cork v Clare all-time results

Cork
Cork county hurling team rivalries